USS Eisele (DE-34) was an  short-hull destroyer escort in the service of the United States Navy.

Eisele was launched on 29 June 1943 at Mare Island Navy Yard, Solano County, California, as BDE-34, by Mrs. George A. Eisele, mother of Seaman Second Class Eisele.  Intended for the British under the Lend-Lease agreement, she was retained by the U.S. Navy and assigned the name Eisele; and commissioned on 18 October 1943.

Namesake

George Raymond "Spud" Eisele was born on 15 May 1923 in Gillette, Wyoming. He was a United States Naval Reserve sailor who was killed in action on 12 November 1942 during the Naval Battle of Guadalcanal. Eisele was manning a gunnery station aboard the heavy cruiser  when a Japanese torpedo plane crashed into his location. Eisele was posthumously awarded the Navy Cross for "courageously refusing to abandon his gun in the face of an on-rushing Japanese torpedo plane."

Service history
Eisele sailed from San Francisco on 11 December 1943 and after touching at Pearl Harbor and Funafuti, arrived in the Gilberts on 5 January 1944. She patrolled off Tarawa and guarded convoys between the Gilberts and Marshalls, returning to Pearl Harbor on 19 May. In June she departed for Eniwetok and screened transports to Guam for support landings on 27 July. She continued to serve in the occupation of the Marianas on screen, convoy escort, and air-sea rescue duty.

Returning to Pearl Harbor on 28 August 1944, Eisele conducted training exercises with submarines until October when she sailed for Eniwetok. There she screened fast tanker convoys safely past the rest of the Carolines, still Japanese held, to Palau and on to the Philippines. In March 1945 Eisele arrived at Ulithi, the staging point for the Okinawa operation, and sailed on the 21st screening escort carriers providing the air cover to capture Okinawa. Except for escorting a convoy to Saipan, Eisele remained with the CVEs off Okinawa fighting off constant air attack.

Eisele was homeward bound on 17 June, and was decommissioned at Seattle on 16 November 1945. She was sold on 29 January 1948.

Awards

References

External links
 
 

Evarts-class destroyer escorts
Ships built in Vallejo, California
1943 ships
World War II frigates and destroyer escorts of the United States